The 2022–23 season is the 104th in the history of AS Saint-Étienne and their first season back in the second division since 2004. The club are participating in Ligue 2 and the Coupe de France.

Players

Squad 
As of 31 January 2023.

Out on loan

Other players under contract

Transfers

In

Out

Pre-season and friendlies

Competitions

Overall record

Ligue 2

League table

Results summary

Results by round

Matches 
The league fixtures were announced on 17 June 2022.

Coupe de France

References

AS Saint-Étienne seasons
Saint-Étienne